The Wänzl or Wänzel rifle was a breechloading conversion of the Lorenz M1854 and M1862 rifles. The Austro-Hungarian Empire used the Wänzel as their service rifle until they had enough Werndl-Holub M1867 rifles to arm the military.

The rifle was a lifting block breechloader chambered for the 14×33mm Wänzel rimfire cartridge. The Austrians converted a total of 70,000 Lorenz muskets to Wänzels.

See also

 Springfield M1873
 Snider-Enfield rifle
 Tabatière rifle
 Green M1867, a Serbian conversion of Lorenz M1854
 Weaponry of the Austro-Hungarian Empire

References

Sources

 Manowar's Hungarian Weapons

Rifles of Austria
World War I Austro-Hungarian infantry weapons
Hinged breechblock rifles
Early rifles